Rock 'n' Roll Habits for the New Wave is an album by the Huntingtons released in 2001 on the Burnt Toast Vinyl label. In 2011, the album was remastered and released digitally to improve clarity, dynamic range and song to song flow. This newly remastered edition includes new cover art.

Track listing
All songs written by Huntingtons, except track 14 (The Muffs) and track 25 (The Go-Go's).

 Alison's the Bomb
 She's Probably Over Me
 JW
 Losing Penny
 She's a Brat
 Rock 'N' Roll Girl
 She's Alright
 All She Knows
 I'm So Stupid
 Veronica
 Mom's in Rehab
 Crackhead
 Nicki Loves Her LSD
 Big Mouth
 The Only One
 Lucy's About to Lose Her Mind
 Drexel U
 Don't Beat Me Up
 Don't Leave Me in the Hospital
 Goddess and the Geek
 Bubblegum Girl
 Heavy Metal's Alive in Baltimore
 True to You
 Leave Home
 We Got the Beat

Personnel
Mikey - Vocals/bass
Cliffy - Guitar/vocals
Danny - Drums
Jonny - Guitar

Additional musicians
Nick Rotundo - guitar solo on track 2
Cate Jinings - girl vocals on tracks 5 and 6
Matt Kirkley - add'l vocals on tracks 6 and 10

Production
Recorded in January 2001 at Clay Creek Recorders
Produced by Holt/Powell
Engineered by Nick Rotundo
Mastered at West West Side Music by Alan Douches
Executive Producer: Scott Hatch

References

The Huntingtons albums
2001 albums